Rebecca Pantaney (born 7 October 1975) is an English badminton player who won gold for England in the women's team event at the 1998 Commonwealth Games.

As a coach she has also traveled to the Falkland Islands where she has coached players at the Stanley Badminton Club, as well as taking them to the Island Games, the 2010 Commonwealth Games in Delhi, India, the 2014 Commonwealth Games in Glasgow, Scotland, and the 27th Brazil Badminton International Cup, in Sao Paulo, Brazil.

She was chosen to be one of the torchbearers for the 2012 Summer Olympics torch relay, carrying the torch across the Clifton Suspension Bridge into Bristol.

References

External links
 

English female badminton players
1975 births
Living people
Commonwealth Games medallists in badminton
Commonwealth Games gold medallists for England
Badminton players at the 1998 Commonwealth Games
Medallists at the 1998 Commonwealth Games